A niqāb or niqaab ("[face] veil"), also called a ruband, is a garment, usually black, that covers the face, worn by some Muslim women as a part of an interpretation of hijab. Muslim women who wear the niqab do so in places where they may encounter non-mahram (un-related) men. Somewhat controversial in some parts of the world, the niqab is most often worn in its region of origin: the Arab countries of the Arabian Peninsula – Saudi Arabia, Yemen, and the United Arab Emirates, where it is common and considered as culturally belonging to the region, though not compulsory.

Historically only found amongst Muslim women in Najd, a region of Saudi Arabia, as well as elsewhere in the Arabian Peninsula, since the late 1970s the Niqab has spread to more religious Muslim women, usually Sunni, throughout the Middle East and worldwide as a result of the Iranian Revolution and the Islamic Revival brought on by the success of the revolution. This phenomenon was encouraged by the rise of “Petro-Islam” by the monarchy of Saudi Arabia in response to the consolidation of the revolution, which funded many mosques to adopt neo-Wahhabi, Salafist ideologies worldwide, resulting in the rise of the Niqab becoming a noticeable consequence of the Islamic Revival in the late 1970s and throughout the 1980s, and of Saudi Arabia's newfound cultural dominance over the Arab world.

Since the 2000s the niqab has attracted significant controversy in the Western world, being perceived as a visible sign of growing Salafist extremism and a rejection of Western society.  Culturally, in the modern world, the face veil has been considered by some to be "a custom imported from Najd, the Saudi region and the power base of its Salafi fundamentalist form of Islam." The Sydney Morning Herald added, "Within Muslim countries it is very contested and considered fringe." In parts of the Muslim world outside of the Arabian Peninsula, where the niqab is less extensively worn, it is regarded warily by Sunni and non-Sunni Muslims "as a symbol of encroaching fundamentalism." For instance in Algeria, the niqab made its presence felt starting in the 1990s and it becoming associated in the Algerian public consciousness with Islamist groups fighting in the 1991-2002 Algerian Civil War as well as being a product of Saudi-funded fundamentalism and as lacking cultural authenticitity. It has also caused a societal clash in Egypt in the 1990s when the niqab was increasingly worn by Egyptian women who imported the custom having returned from work in the Arabian Peninsula.

There are currently 16 states that have banned the niqab and burqa, both Muslim-majority countries and non-Muslim countries, including Tunisia, Austria, Denmark, France, Belgium, Tajikistan, Uzbekistan, Bulgaria, Cameroon, Chad, the Republic of the Congo, Gabon, the Netherlands, China, Morocco, Sri Lanka and Switzerland. Most Islamic scholars consider the niqab to not be compulsory for practising women. The terms niqab and burqa are often confused; a niqab covers the face while leaving the eyes uncovered and today can be found amongst Muslim women in many different countries, while a burqa covers the entire body from the top of the head to the ground, with only a mesh screen allowing the wearer to see, and is usually only found in Afghanistan and sometimes traditionally in Central Asia.

Use of the term in Arabic
Women who wear the niqab are often called ; this word is used both as a noun and as an adjective. Women in niqab are also called  , with the plural  .

Pre-Islamic use of face veils

Various types of face veils have been in use since pre-Islamic times.

Face veiling in Islam

Most Islamic scholars and most contemporary Islamic jurists have agreed that women are not required to cover their face. There exist a number of reasons why women may cover their face in public, and this practice must be understood within a particular social context.

Criminalization and bans
There are currently 16 states that have banned the niqab and burqa, both Muslim-majority countries and non-Muslim countries, including Tunisia, Austria, Denmark, France, Belgium, Tajikistan, Uzbekistan, Bulgaria, Cameroon, Chad, the Republic of the Congo, Gabon, the Netherlands, China, Morocco, Sri Lanka and Switzerland.

The niqab is controversial in the Western world. In France specifically, although the niqab is not individually targeted, it falls within the scope of legislation which bans the wearing of any religious items (Christian, Jewish, Muslim, Hindu, or Buddhist) in state schools (universities are not affected), and another ban on face coverings (which also includes carnival masks and motorbike helmets when not on a motorbike).

In 2004, the French Parliament passed a law to regulate "the wearing of symbols indicating religious affiliation in public educational establishments". This law forbids all emblems that outwardly express a specific religious belief to be worn in French public schools. This law was proposed because the Stasi Commission, a committee that is supposed to enforce secularity in French society, was forced to deal with frequent disputes about headscarves in French public schools, as outsiders of the practice did not understand the scarves' purpose and therefore felt uncomfortable.

Although the French law addresses other religious symbols – not just Islamic headscarves and face coverings – the international debate has been centered around the impact it has on Muslims because of the growing population in Europe, especially in France, and the increase in Islamophobia.

In July 2010, the National Assembly in France passed Loi Interdisant La Dissimulation Du Visage Dans L'espace Public, (Act Prohibiting Concealment of the Face in Public Space). This act outlawed the wearing of clothing that covers one's face in any public space. Violators of the ban on veils and coverings are liable to fines of up to 150 euros and mandatory classes on French citizenship. Anyone found to have forced a woman to wear a religious covering faces up to two years in prison as well as a €60,000 fine.

In October 2018, the United Nations Human Rights Committee declared that France's ban disproportionately harmed the right of women to manifest their religious beliefs, and could have the effects of "confining them to their homes, impeding their access to public services and marginalizing them."

Styles

There are many styles of niqab and other facial veils worn by Muslim women around the world. The two most common forms are the half niqab and the gulf-style or full niqab.

The half niqab is a simple length of fabric with elastic or ties and is worn around the face. This garment typically leaves the eyes and part of the forehead visible.

The gulf-style or full niqab completely covers the face. It consists of an upper band that is tied around the forehead, together with a long wide piece of fabric which covers the face, leaving an opening for the eyes. Many full niqab have two or more sheer layers attached to the upper band, which can be worn flipped down to cover the eyes or left over the top of the head. While a person looking at a woman wearing a niqab with an eyeveil would not be able to see her eyes, the woman wearing the niqab would be able to see out through the thin fabric.

Other less common and more cultural or national forms of niqab include the Afghan style burqa, a long pleated gown that extends from the head to the feet with a small crocheted grille over the face. The Pak chador is a relatively new style from Pakistan, which consists of a large triangular scarf with two additional pieces. A thin band on one edge is tied behind the head so as to keep the chador on, and then another larger rectangular piece is attached to one end of the triangle and is worn over the face, and the simple hijāb wrapped, pinned or tied in a certain way so as to cover the wearer's face.

Other common styles of clothing popularly worn with a niqab in Western countries include the khimar, a semi-circular flare of fabric with an opening for the face and a small triangular underscarf. A khimar is usually bust-level or longer, and can also be worn without the niqab. It is considered a fairly easy form of headscarf to wear, as there are no pins or fasteners; it is simply pulled over the head. Gloves are also sometimes worn with the niqab, because many munaqqabāt believe no part of the skin should be visible other than the area immediately around the eyes or because they do not want to be put in a position where they would touch the hand of an unrelated man (for instance, when accepting change from a cashier). Most munaqqabāt also wear an overgarment (jilbab, abaya etc.) over their clothing, though some munaqabat in Western countries wear a long, loose tunic and skirt instead of a one-piece overgarment.

In different countries

Egypt
The niqab in Egypt has a complex and long history. On 8 October 2009, Egypt's top Islamic school and the world's leading school of Sunni Islam, Al-Azhar, banned the wearing of the niqab in classrooms and dormitories of all its affiliate schools and educational institutes.

Iran
The niqab was traditionally worn in Southern Iran from the arrival of Islam until the end of the Qajar era. There were many regional variations of niqab, which were also called ruband or pushiye. Traditionally, Iranian women wore chadors long before Islam arrived.

The 20th century ruler, Reza Shah, banned all variations of face veil and veils in 1936 known as Kashf-e hijab, as incompatible with his ambitions to westernize the citizens of Iran and their traditional historical culture. Reza Shah ordered the police to arrest women who wore the niqab and hijab and to remove their face veils by force. This policy outraged the clerics who believed it was obligatory for women to cover their faces. Many women gathered at the Goharshad Mosque in Mashhad with their faces covered to show their objection to the niqab ban.

Between 1941 and 1979 wearing the niqab and hijab was no longer against the law, but it was considered by the government to be a "badge of backwardness." During these years, wearing the niqab and chador became much less common and instead most religious women wore headscarves only. Fashionable hotels and restaurants refused to admit women wearing niqabs. High schools and universities actively discouraged or even banned the niqab, though the headscarf was tolerated.

After the new government of 'Islamic Republic' was established, the niqab ban was not enforced by officials.

In modern Iran, the wearing of niqab is not common and is only worn by certain ethnic minorities and a minority of Arab Muslims in the southern Iranian coastal cities, such as Bandar Abbas, Minab and Bushehr. Some women in the Arab-populated province of Khuzestan still wear the niqab.

Pakistan
In 2015, the constitutional Council of Islamic Ideology issued the fatwa that women are not required to wear niqab or cover their hands or feet under Shariah.

Saudi Arabia
The niqab is an important part of Saudi culture and in most Saudi cities (including Riyadh, Mecca, Medina, Jeddah, etc.) the vast majority of women cover their faces.
The Saudi niqab usually leaves a long open slot for the eyes; the slot is held together by a string or narrow strip of cloth. In 2008, the Mohammad Habadan, a religious authority in Mecca, reportedly called on women to wear veils that reveal only one eye, so that women would not be encouraged to use eye make-up.

Syria
1,200 niqab-wearing teachers were transferred to administrative duties in the summer of 2010 in Syria because the face veil was undermining the secular policies followed by the state as far as education is concerned. In the summer of 2010, students wearing the niqab were prohibited from registering for university classes. The ban was associated with a move by the Syrian government to re-affirm Syria's traditional secular atmosphere.

On 6 April 2011 it was reported that teachers would be allowed to once again wear the niqab.

Yemen
Since antiquity, the Arab tradition of wearing the niqab has been practiced by women living in Yemen. Traditionally, girls begin wearing veils in their teenage years.

Acceptance of the niqab is not universal in Yemen. A senior member of the Al-Islah political party, Tawakkol Karman, removed her niqab at a human rights conference in 2004 and since then has called for "other women and female activists to take theirs off".

Enforcement, encouragement and bans

Enforcement
Covering the face was enforced by the Taliban regime with the traditional Afghan face veil called the burka.

Politics
The niqab is outlawed in Azerbaijan, where the overwhelming majority of the population is Muslim. Niqabi women, just like women wearing hijab, cannot work as public servants, neither can they continue studies at schools, including the private schools. Although there is no single law banning niqab at private companies, it would be nearly impossible for a niqabi woman to find work.

In February 2010, an Arab country's unnamed ambassador to Dubai had his marriage annulled after discovering that his bride was cross-eyed and had facial hair. The woman had worn a niqab on the occasions that the couple had met prior to the wedding. The ambassador informed the Sharia court that he had been deliberately deceived by the bride's mother, who had shown him photographs of the bride's sister. He only discovered this when he lifted the niqab to kiss his bride. The court annulled the marriage, but refused a claim for compensation.

Sultaana Freeman gained national attention in 2003 when she sued the US state of Florida for the right to wear a niqab for her driver's license photo. However, a Florida circuit court ruled there was no violation in the state requiring her to show her face to a camera in a private room with only a female employee to take the picture, in exchange for the privilege of driving. The ruling was affirmed by the appellate court.

One female non-Muslim student at Eastern Michigan University spent a semester in 2005 wearing a niqab for a class project (she referred to the face veil as a "burqa"). Her stated experiences, such as her own feeling as if no one wanted to be near her, led her to assert that conservative Muslim dress is disapproved of in the United States.

Some Muslim Palestinian women, particularly students, have worn white niqabs during Arab protest activities relating to the Arab–Israeli conflict.

In 2006, female candidates from the Hamas party campaigned during the Palestinian Authority parliamentary elections, wearing niqabs.

Africa

Cameroon 
In July 2015, Cameroon banned the face veil including the burqa after two women dressed in the religious garments completed a suicide attack killing 13. This was also done in order to counter extremism in public and places of work.

Chad 
In June 2015, the full face veil was banned in Chad after veiled Boko Haram bombers disguised as women completed multiple suicide attacks.

Republic of the Congo 
In May 2015, the Republic of the Congo banned the face veil in order to counter extremism. The decision was announced by El Hadji Djibril Bopaka, the president of the country's Islamic High Council.

Algeria 
In October 2018 the Algerian government banned the wearing of full-face veils, including the niqab, for female public servants while at work.

Morocco 
The Moroccan government distributed letters to businesses on 9 January 2017 declaring a ban on the burka. The letters indicated the "sale, production and import" or the garment were prohibited and businesses were expected to clear their stock within 48 hours.

Tunisia 
In July 2019, wearing the niqab was banned in government buildings. The ban came after the capital Tunis was attacked by three suicide bombings in seven days.

Asia

China 
In February 2015, the city of Ürümqi banned face veils in order to counter extremism. The Chinese government later expanded the ban to all of Xinjiang in March 2017.

Sri Lanka 
Face veils were banned in the aftermath of the 2019 Sri Lanka Easter bombings.

Tajikistan 
In 2017 the government of Tajikistan passed a law requiring people to "stick to traditional national clothes and culture", which has been widely seen as an attempt to prevent women from wearing traditional Islamic clothing, in particular the style of headscarf wrapped under the chin, in contrast to the traditional Tajik headscarf tied behind the head.

Europe

Bulgaria 
In 2016, a legal ban on face-covering Islamic clothing was adopted by the Bulgarian parliament.

Denmark 

In autumn 2017, the Danish parliament (Danish: Folketinget) agreed to adopt a law prohibiting people to wear "attire and clothing masking the face in such a way that it impairs recognizability". A full ban on both niqabs and burqas was announced on 31 May 2018. The ban came into force on 1 August 2018 and carries a fine of 1000 DKK, about 134 euro, by repeat offending the fine may reach 10 000 DKK. Then targets all garments that covers the face, such as fake beards or balaclavas. Supporters of the ban claim that the ban facilitates integration of Muslims into Danish society while Amnesty International claimed the ban violated women's rights. A protest numbering 300-400 people was held in the Nørrebro district of Copenhagen organised by Socialist Youth Front, Kvinder i Dialog and Party Rebels.

The first fine was issued in Hørsholm in August 2018 to a woman dressed in a niqab who was in a fistfight with another woman on an escalator in a shopping centre. During the fight, her face-covering veil fell off, but as police approached, she put it on again and police issued the fine. Both women were suspected of public order violations.

Latvia 
In 2016, a legal ban on face-covering Islamic clothing was proposed for adoption by the Latvian parliament.

Norway 
In 2012 in Norway, a professor at the University of Tromsø denied a student's use of niqab in the classroom. The professor claimed Norway's parliament granted each teacher the right to deny the use of niqab in his/her classroom. Clothing that covers the face, such as a niqab, is prohibited in some schools and municipalities.

The Prime Minister of Norway Erna Solberg stated in an interview that in Norwegian work environments it is essential to see each other's faces and therefore anyone who insists on wearing a niqab is in practice unemployable. Solberg also views the wearing of the niqab as a challenge to social boundaries in the Norwegian society, a challenge that would be countered by Norway setting boundaries of its own. Solberg also stated that anyone may wear what they wish in their spare time and that her comments applied to professional life but that any immigrant has the obligation to adapt to Norwegian work life and culture.

In June 2018, the parliament of Norway passed a bill banning clothing covering the face at educational institutions as well as daycare centres, which included face-covering Islamic veils. The prohibition applies to pupils and staff alike.

Sweden 
In 2012, a poll by Uppsala University found that Swedes believed that face-covering Islamic veils are either completely unacceptable or fairly unacceptable, 85% for the burqa and 81% for the niqāb. The researchers noted these figures represented a compact resistance to the face-covering veil by the population of Sweden.

In December 2019, the municipality of Skurup banned Islamic veils in educational institutions. Earlier, the municipality of Staffanstorp approved a similar ban.

United Kingdom 
In the United Kingdom, comments by Jack Straw, MP started a national debate over the wearing of the "veil" (niqab), in October 2006. Around that time there was media coverage of the case of Aishah Azmi, a teaching assistant in Dewsbury, West Yorkshire, who lost her appeal against suspension from her job for wearing the niqab while teaching English to young children. It was decided that being unable to see her face prevented the children from learning effectively. Azmi, who had been interviewed and hired for the position without the niqab, allegedly on her husband's advice, argued it was helping the children understand different people's beliefs. In 2010, a man committed a bank robbery wearing a niqab as a disguise.

Italy 
In Italy, a law issued in 1975 strictly forbids wearing any attire in public that could hide the face of a person. Penalties (fines and imprisonment) are provided for such behaviour. The original purpose of the anti-mask law was to prevent crime or terrorism. The law allows for exemptions for a "justified cause", which has sometimes been interpreted by courts as including religious reasons for wearing a veil, but others – including local governments – disagree and claim religion is not a "justified cause" in this context.

Austria 
In 2017, a legal ban on face-covering Islamic clothing was adopted by the Austrian parliament.

Belgium 
On 29 April 2010, the Belgian Chamber of Representatives adopted a law prohibiting people to wear "attire and clothing masking the face in such a way that it impairs recognizability". The penalty for violating this directive can run from up to 14 days imprisonment and a 250 euro fine.

On 11 July 2017 the ban in Belgium was upheld by the European Court of Human Rights (ECHR) after having been challenged by two Muslim women who claimed their rights had been infringed.

France 
On 13 July 2010 France's lower house of parliament overwhelmingly approved a ban on wearing burqa-style Islamic veils. The legislation forbids face-covering Muslim veils in all public places in France and calls for fines or citizenship classes, or both. The bill also is aimed at husbands and fathers – anyone convicted of forcing someone else to wear the garb risks a year of prison and a fine, with both penalties, doubled if the victim is a minor.

Germany 
In 2017, a legal ban on face-covering clothing for soldiers and state workers during work was approved by German parliament. Also in 2017, a legal ban on face-covering clothing for car and truck drivers was approved by German Ministry of Traffic.

In July 2017, German state Bavaria approved a legal ban on face-covering clothing for teachers, state workers and students at university and schools.

In August 2017, the state of Lower Saxony (German: Niedersachsen) banned the burqa along with the niqab in public schools. This change in the law was prompted by a Muslim pupil in Osnabrück who wore the garment to school for years and refused to take it off. Since she has completed her schooling, the law was instituted to prevent similar cases in the future.

In July 2020, the state of Baden-Württemberg banned face-covering veils for pupils, which extended the ban which was already in force for school staff.

Netherlands 
In 2007, the government of the Netherlands planned a legal ban on face-covering Islamic clothing, popularly described as the 'burqa ban', which included the niqab. In 2015, a partial ban of the niqab and burqa were approved by the Dutch government. The parliament still had to approve the measure. In November 2016, the legal ban on face-covering was approved by parliament. On 26 June 2018, a partial ban on face covering (including niqabs) on public transport and in buildings and associated yards of educational institutions, governmental institutions and healthcare institutions was enacted, with a number of exceptions.

Switzerland 
In July 2016, the Canton of Ticino banned face-covering veils.

In September 2018, a ban on face-covering veils was approved with a 67% vote in favour in the canton of St Gallen. The largest Islamic community organisation in Switzerland, the Islamic Central Council, recommended that Muslim women continue to cover their faces.

In March 2021, a nationwide referendum was held on whether full-face coverings should be banned in public, which includes niqabs and burqas. Voters narrowly voted to ban niqabs and burqas by a 51.2% to 48.8% margin.

North America

Canada 
The niqab is banned in the Canadian province of Quebec in all publicly funded services. Persons cannot receive public service or provide public service with their faces covered. This includes public transportation, hospitals, and courts amongst others. On 18 October 2017, Bill 62 passed into law after a 66–51 vote in the Quebec National Assembly. The new law is entitled "An Act to foster adherence to State religious neutrality and, in particular, to provide a framework for requests for accommodation on religious grounds in certain bodies". However, regulations regarding the ban's implementation, and religious accommodations, are not expected until July 2018.

On 16 November 2015 the first act of Canada's newly appointed Minister of Justice and Attorney General Jody Wilson-Raybould was to assure women who chose to wear the niqāb during the Oath of Allegiance of their right to do so. In December 2011 then-Citizenship and Immigration Minister Jason Kenney announced a policy directive from the Federal Government under then-Prime Minister Stephen Harper that Muslim women must remove niqābs throughout the citizenship ceremony where they declare their Oath of Allegiance. Zunera Ishaq, a Sunni Muslim woman living in Mississauga, Ontario, challenged and won the niqāb ban in the case of Canada v Ishaq on 5 October 2015. The Federal Court of Appeal decision in her favour was seen by some as "an opportunity to revisit the rules governing the somewhat difficult relationship between law and policy." In October 2015 Harper had appealed the Supreme Court of Canada to take up the case. With the election of Prime Minister Justin Trudeau on 19 October 2015, the niqāb debate was settled as the Liberal government chose to not "politicize the issue any further." Minister Wilson-Raybould, who is the first Indigenous person to be named as Justice Minister, explained as she withdrew Harper's appeal to the Supreme Court, "In all of our policy as a government we will ensure that we respect the values that make us Canadians, those of diversity, inclusion and respect for those fundamental values." The Justice Minister spoke with Zunera by telephone to tell her the news prior to making her official announcement.

Elections Canada, the agency responsible for elections and referendums, stated that Muslim women can cover their faces while voting. The decision was criticized by the Conservative Party of Canada, Bloc Québécois, and Liberal Party of Canada. The New Democrats were not opposed to the decision. The Conservative federal Cabinet had introduced legislation to parliament that would bar citizens from voting if they arrived at polling stations with a veiled face.

The niqāb became an issue in the 2007 election in Quebec after it became public knowledge that women wearing the niqāb were allowed to vote under the same rules as electors who did not present photo identification (ID); namely, by sworn oath in the presence of a third party who could vouch for their identity. The chief electoral officer received complaints that this policy was too accommodating of cultural minorities (a major theme in the election) and thereafter required accompaniment by bodyguards due to threatening telephone calls. All three major Quebec political parties were against the policy, with the Parti Québécois and Action démocratique du Québec vying for position as most opposed. The policy was soon changed to require all voters to show their face, even if they did not carry photo ID. However, Quebec residents who wear the niqāb stated they were not opposed to showing their faces for official purposes, such as voting. Salam Elmenyawi of the Muslim Council of Montreal estimated that only 10 to 15 Muslim voters in the province wear the niqāb and, since their veils have become controversial, most would probably not vote.

In October 2009, the Muslim Canadian Congress called for a ban on burqa and niqāb, saying that they have "no basis in Islam". Spokesperson Farzana Hassan cited public safety issues, such as identity concealment, as well as gender equality, stating that wearing the burqa and niqāb is "a practice that marginalizes women."

In December 2012, the Supreme Court of Canada ruled that Muslim women who wear the niqāb must remove it in some cases when testifying in court.

United States 
In 2002, Sultaana Freeman (formerly Sandra Keller, who converted to Islam in 1997 when marrying a Muslim man), sued the U.S. state of Florida for the right to wear a niqab for her driver's license photo. However, a Florida appellate court ruled that there was no violation in the state requiring her to show her face to a camera in a private room with only a female employee to take the picture, in exchange for the privilege of driving. The prevailing view in Florida is currently that hiding one's face on a form of photo identification defeats the purpose of having the picture taken, although 15 other states (including Arkansas, California, Idaho, Indiana, Iowa, Kansas, and Louisiana) have provisions that allow for driver's licenses absent of an identifying photograph in order to accommodate individuals who may have a religious reason to not have a photograph taken. In 2012, a string of armed robberies in Philadelphia were committed by people disguised in traditional Islamic woman's garb; Muslim leaders were concerned that the use of the disguises could put Muslim women in danger of hate crimes and inflame ethnic tensions.

Australia 
In May 2010, an armed robbery committed by a man wearing a face veil and sunglasses raised calls to ban the Islamic veil; a request for new legislation was dismissed by both Prime Minister Kevin Rudd and Liberal leader Tony Abbott.

See also

References

Further reading
 
 Refusing the Veil: Alibhai-Brown, Yasmin. 2014, Biteback Publishing, .

External links

 Religion and Ethics – Beliefs: Niqab, British Broadcasting Corporation (BBC), 13 April 2007.
 Modesty Gowns for Female Patients, BBC, 5 September 2006
 The Veil and the British Male Elite, Social Science Research Network (SSRN)
 Niqab is Not Obligatory
 The Last Straw!

Arab culture
Arabic clothing
Islam-related controversies
Islamic female clothing
Modesty in Islam
Purdah
Veils